Neopasiphae simplicior, a native bee, is an endangered species found near Perth, Western Australia. Body is creamy yellow and brown, 7 mm long and wings up to 5 mm long.  The Swan Coastal Plain has undergone agricultural and suburban development which has reduced the range and threatens the species with extinction. It has been collected at Cannington and the Forrestdale golf course. The species has been found on Lobelia tenuior, Goodenia filiformis and Angianthus preissianus.

References

External links

Colletidae
Hymenoptera of Australia
Arthropods of Western Australia
Insects described in 1965
Endangered fauna of Australia
Endemic fauna of Southwest Australia